United to Boost Senegal (BSS) is a Senegalese Political coalition, active in the 22 March 2009 Municipal elections in that country.  The coalition is made up of members of a number of parties opposed to President Abdoulaye Wade's ruling Senegalese Democratic Party (Parti Démocratique Sénégalais) and its Sopi Coalition. Coalition partners include the Socialist Party of Senegal, Alliance of the Forces of Progress, Front for Socialism and Democracy/Benno Jubël, and Reform Movement for Social Development. Prominent BSS members include Khalifa Sall, Biram Sassoum Sy, Doudou Issa Niasse,  and Haoua Dia Thiam. The party's colours are Green and Yellow.

March 2009 elections
The party scored several notable victories in the 2009 elections, including the election of former PS government minister Khalifa Sall as Mayor of Dakar   and Fsd/Bj Secretary General Cheikh Bamba Dièye as Mayor of Saint-Louis. BSS candidates won local seats across Senegal in the March elections, including Joal-Fadiouth: in M'bour Department the BSS candidates won 12 of 16 local councils. Prominent PS members of the coalition won mayor races in Yène, Louga, Mermoz-Sacré Cœur, Podor and Kaffrine. In the run up to the 2009 elections, splits began to appear in the BSS coalition, with non-PS candidates such as MRDS member Imam Mbaye Niang breaking with the PS.

References

External links
 "Votez Bennoo Siggil Senegaal": Local Elections 2009 official website.
 Bennoo Siggil Senegaal Dakar official website.

Political parties in Senegal